Gruppo Sportivo Fascio Giovanni Grion Pola was an Italian association football club located in Pola, now Pula in Croatia. The team was founded in 1918 as F.C. Grion Pola and was dissolved in 1945, when their home city passed from Italy to Yugoslavia. Its colors were black and white.

The club took part to 2 Serie B seasons in the 1930s and retired during their third.

The side was named after an Istrian soldier that died during the first World War and their home colours were the same as Casale's, to honour their scudetto, won in 1914.

References
Gruppo Sportivo Fascio Grion Pola Italian wiki article
 Elvino Tomasini, I nerostellati del Grion di Pola. Ed. Nicoli, Parma, 1980.

Defunct football clubs in Italy
Defunct football clubs in Croatia
Football clubs in Istria County
Association football clubs established in 1918
Association football clubs disestablished in 1945
Serie B clubs
Serie C clubs
1918 establishments in Croatia
1945 disestablishments in Croatia